Raikoh may refer to:
 Raikou (Pokémon)
 Minamoto no Yoritomo